Patania inferior is a moth of the family Crambidae. It was described by George Hampson in 1899. It is found in Siberia, Japan, Taiwan, and Indonesia.

It was originally described by Victor Motschulsky in 1861; the present name is a replacement name.

References

Hampson, G. F. (1899). "A revision of the moths of the subfamily Pyraustinae and family Pyralidae. Part I". Proceedings of the Zoological Society of London. 1898 (4): 590–761, pls 49–5.

Moths described in 1899
Moths of Japan
Moths of Taiwan
Spilomelinae
Taxa named by George Hampson